Långfors (long rapids) is a village within the Swedish municipality of Kalix. Långfors is located 10 kilometres north of Töre to the Töre River.

References

Populated places in Kalix Municipality
Norrbotten